Grayson Mallet-Prevost Murphy Sr. (December 19, 1878 – October 18, 1937) was an American banker and company director.

Early life
Murphy was born on December 19, 1878 in Philadelphia and attended Haverford College. He served as a volunteer in the Spanish–American War, and later attended the United States Military Academy, graduating in 1903. He was a lieutenant in the Philippine–American War, in charge of operations, 42nd Division. He was a recipient of the Army Distinguished Service Medal, as authorized by Congress on July 9, 1918.

Business career
Murphy was a senior vice president of Guaranty Trust Company. He was also Founder and Head of G.M.-P. Murphy & Co. He served on the boards of directors of the Anaconda Copper Mining Company, Guaranty Trust Company, New York Trust Company, Bethlehem Steel, Goodyear Tire & Rubber, New York Railways, Fifth Avenue Coach Company, and Chicago Motor Coach Company.

Civic activities
Murphy was very active in the Association Against the Prohibition Amendment and voiced his opposition to the 18th Amendment at a Congressional hearing. His efforts contributed to the repeal of prohibition in the United States. He was the first European Commissioner of the American Red Cross during World War I. Murphy was also implicated in the 1935 Business Plot exposed by General Smedley Butler to overthrow President Franklin Roosevelt in a military coup.

Murphy was the chief commissioner of the American Red Cross in Europe, and treasurer of the American Liberty League.

Death
Murphy died on October 18, 1937 in Manhattan, New York City. His funeral was held at St. James Protestant Episcopal Church at Seventy-first Street and Madison Avenue in Manhattan.

References

Further reading
 

 

1878 births
1937 deaths
People from Philadelphia
Haverford College alumni
United States Military Academy alumni
Bethlehem Steel people
American financial businesspeople
Prohibition in the United States
Recipients of the Distinguished Service Medal (US Army)